The Department of Energy was a department of the United Kingdom Government. The department was established in January 1974, when the responsibility for energy production was transferred away from the Department of Trade and Industry in the wake of the 1973 oil crisis and with the importance of North Sea oil increasing.

Following the privatisation of the energy industries in the United Kingdom, which had begun some ten years earlier, the department was abolished in 1992. Many of its functions were abandoned, with the remainder being absorbed into other bodies or departments. The Office of Gas Supply (Ofgas) and the Office of Electricity Regulation (OFFER) took over market regulation, the Energy Efficiency Office was transferred to the Department of the Environment, and various media-related functions were transferred to the Department of National Heritage. The core activities relating to UK energy policy were transferred back to the Department of Trade and Industry (DTI).

The Department of Energy was a significant source of funding for energy research, and for investigations into the potential for renewable energy technologies in the UK. Work funded or part-funded by the department included investigations into Geothermal power and the Severn Barrage

Ministers

Secretary of State for Energy
Colour key (for political parties):
Politicians: 

Junior ministers included Peter Morrison (Minister of State in 1987) and Patrick Jenkin.

Earlier and later ministries

Although only formed in 1974, the Department of Energy was not the first ministry to handle energy-related matters. The Ministry of Fuel and Power was created on 11 June 1942 from functions separated from the Board of Trade.  It took charge of coal production, allocation of supplies of fuels, control of energy prices and petrol rationing during World War II.

The Ministry of Fuel and Power was renamed the Ministry of Power in January 1957.  The Ministry of Power later became part of the Ministry of Technology on 6 October 1969, which merged into the Department of Trade and Industry on 20 October 1970.

The post of Secretary of State for Energy was re-created in 2008 as the Secretary of State for Energy and Climate Change.

See also

Energy use and conservation in the United Kingdom
Secretary of State for Energy and Climate Change

References

External links
   History of the Department of Energy

Energy
Department of Energy and Climate Change
Ministries established in 1974
1974 establishments in the United Kingdom
1992 disestablishments in the United Kingdom
Defunct environmental agencies
Energy ministries
Energy in the United Kingdom